Radical 88 or radical father or light meaning "father" is one of the 34 Kangxi radicals (214 radicals in total) composed of 4 strokes.

In the Kangxi Dictionary, there are 10 characters (out of 49,030) to be found under this radical.

 is also the 87th indexing component in the Table of Indexing Chinese Character Components predominantly adopted by Simplified Chinese dictionaries published in mainland China.

Evolution

Derived characters

Literature

External links

Unihan Database - U+7236

088
087